Mappillai is a 2016 Indian Tamil language soap opera starring Senthil Kumar and Sreeja Chandran. STAR Vijay initially broadcast the series on weeknights at 9:00PM (IST), with the debut episode screened on 14 November 2016. On 26 June 2017, the broadcast time of the show was changed to 8:00PM (IST).

The show reunited actor-actress couple, Senthil Kumar and Sreeja Chandran, who previously starred together in television soap operas Madhurai, and the first season of Saravanan Meenatchi. The show ended from 6 October 2017 with 241 Episodes.

Plot
It is a story about Senthil (Senthil Kumar) who is forced to live in his mother-in law's house which isn't a dignity according to Tamil people. Further, the show deals with the difficulties he goes through in Jaya`s (Sreeja Chandran) house because of her parents and how a husband supports his wife in achieving success in her life.

Cast

Main
 Senthil Kumar as Senthil Kumar "Senthil"
 Sreeja Chandran as Jaya Chandran "Jaya" (Maya) 
 Pandi Kamal as Kamal
 Janani Ashok Kumar as Janani Kamal 
 Rajashekar as Chandran, Jaya, Ramya, Janani, Sakthi & Divya's father

Recurring
 Azhgappan as Azhagappan
 Anbazhgan as Anbazhagan "Anbu"
 Priya Prince as Priya
 Ramya Ramakrishna as Ramya Chandran
 Teenu as Sakthi Tamizh: Krish's 1st lover and Tamizh's wife
 Vaishali Taniga as Divya Chandran
 Sabitha Anand as Sharadha: Senthil, Kamal & Shalu's mother
 Shamily Sukumar as Shalu, Senthil's sister & Krish's wife 
 RJ Navalakshmi as police inspector Selvi
 Viji Kannan as Parvathi Jaya, Ramya, Janani, Sakthi & Divya's mother
 Devi Priya as Devi
 Maanas Chavali as Krishna "Krish"
 Amit Bhargav as Deepak
 Stalin Muthu as Tamizh
 Yamini as Maggi aka Madhumitha
 Kumaran Thangarajan as Jeeva

Airing history 
The show started airing on Vijay TV on 14 November 2016 and It aired on Monday through Friday at 9:00PM (IST). Later its timing changed Starting from Monday 26 June 2017, the show was shifted to airs Monday through Friday at 8:00PM (IST) time Slot. A new show named Bigg Boss Tamil replaced this show at 9:00PM (IST).

Awards and nominations 
In 2017, at its  Vijay Television Awards, the channel gave its Nominated nine Category awards and This series was won Four awards.

References

External links
Official Website at hotstar

Star Vijay original programming
Tamil-language television shows
2010s Tamil-language television series
2016 Tamil-language television series debuts
2017 Tamil-language television series endings